The 1955–56 San Francisco Dons men's basketball team represented the University of San Francisco as a member of the California Basketball Association during the 1955–56 NCAA men's basketball season. The Dons ended the season undefeated, becoming the first NCAA tournament champion to record a perfect season and the first team to go wire-to-wire as No. 1 in the AP and UP polls. San Francisco finished the season with a 29–0 record (14–0 CBA) and had won 55 consecutive games.

Season summary
San Francisco won two straight NCAA titles behind a punishing defense led by Bill Russell, who turned shot blocking into an art form. He was also better scorer than history gives him credit for, averaging more than 20 points in both championship seasons. In 1956, Russell had support from guard K.C. Jones and a balanced lineup; besides Russell, five other players averaged between 7.1 and 9.8 points per game.

Roster

Schedule and results

|-
!colspan=9 style=| Regular Season

|-
!colspan=9 style=| NCAA Tournament

Rankings

Awards and honors
Bill Russell – Consensus First Team All-America selection, Helms Foundation College Basketball Player of the Year (2x), UPI College Basketball Player of the Year, California Basketball Association Player of the Year
K. C. Jones – Consensus Second Team All-America selection
Phil Woolpert – UPI College Basketball Coach of the Year

Team players drafted into the NBA

References

San Francisco
San Francisco Dons men's basketball seasons
NCAA Division I men's basketball tournament championship seasons
NCAA Division I men's basketball tournament Final Four seasons
San Francisco
San Francisco Dons
San Francisco Dons